Rodney Howell Palmer  (24 November 1907 – 24 April 1987) was an English cricketer. A right-handed batsman and right-arm fast bowler, he played for Hampshire County Cricket Club between 1930 and 1933. He also played first-class cricket for Cambridge University and minor counties cricket for Berkshire in addition to representing the Egypt national cricket team.

Biography
Palmer was educated at Harrow and Pembroke College, Cambridge. His cricket career started with Berkshire, who he played for in the Minor Counties Championship in 1928 and 1929. He made his first-class debut for Cambridge University against Essex in the 1929 English cricket season.

He made his debut for Hampshire the following season, playing a County Championship match against Kent in Southampton. He returned to the Hampshire side for two County Championship matches against Yorkshire and Kent in the 1933 season but did not play first-class cricket again. He failed to score a single run during his four first-class matches.

He played six matches for the Egyptian national side against HM Martineau's XI between 1932 and 1936. He died in Berkshire in 1987 aged 79.

Palmer joined the 12th Lancers in 1930. He served in World War II and was awarded the Military Cross in 1943, along with other officers, "in recognition of gallant and distinguished services in the Middle East". He was High Sheriff of Berkshire in 1953 when he was living at Peasemore Manor.

References

1907 births
1987 deaths
People from Sherfield on Loddon
People from West Berkshire District
Egyptian cricketers
English cricketers
Hampshire cricketers
Cambridge University cricketers
Berkshire cricketers
People educated at Harrow School
Alumni of Pembroke College, Cambridge
12th Royal Lancers officers
British Army personnel of World War II
High Sheriffs of Berkshire